The Chinese Ambassador to the Dominican Republic is the official representative of the People's Republic of China to the Dominican Republic.

List of representatives

See also

China–Dominican Republic relations

References 

 
Dominican Republic
China